Time Warp (formerly Tomb Raider: The Ride) is a flying roller coaster operating at Canada's Wonderland. It opened on May 2, 2004.

Ride layout and experience

The ride commences by loading passengers into a 4-person car and rotating the cars facing the ground. The vehicles proceed with a horizontal lift and push forward so that it engages with the rotating lift mechanism. The vehicles ascend into a spiral lift that gives riders a 360-degree view of their surroundings.

Once vehicles reach the top, they dive down and accelerate before making a quick turn to the left and into the first in-line twist. The ride turns to the right and into the first set of block brakes that slows the vehicles before another making a small dip downward and another right turn into the second in-line twist. After a quick turn to the left, the vehicles passes into the second set of brakes and then makes another diving left turn. There are a few quick turns until the vehicles return to the station. Once the riders are lowered to the standing position, the restraints are unlocked and vehicles are unloaded.

The ride has drawn criticism for a number of reasons. The restraint system has been described as uncomfortable and prone to causing "headbanging." The transitions between the in-line twists, the turns and the dives have all been criticized as rough. The ride's low capacity, due to the complexity of the full body restraint design and the four-passenger trains, has also been a source of criticism.

Special effects

Its theme featured the 2003 Paramount Pictures film Lara Croft Tomb Raider: The Cradle of Life.
When the ride opened in 2004, the ride's entrance queue featured theming and special effects to resemble an ancient tomb. The entrance sign was mounted onto bamboo sticks and stone columns with propane torches. Next to the entrance was a tent which resembles Lara Croft's base with two motorcycles. Beyond the entrance were Chinese stone soldiers akin to the Terracotta Army and a stone wall with images resembling deities found in ancient Buddhist and Hindu artworks. The queue and exit were guided by rope fences. Bat sounds looped while riders waited in the station.

The ride area was filled with a rumbling sound that got louder to entice riders. As this happened, flame torches would get bigger and at night the station's flood lights turn red.

Since its opening and with the name change after the Cedar Fair takeover, much of the theming is removed. The tent next to the queue is removed with nothing but a few plants in its place. The propane torches are no longer used. The Chinese soldiers inside the queue are removed, but the stone mural is still present. The rope in the queue lines is replaced by wooden planks. No sound effects are played inside the station.

See also
Flying roller coaster

External links

 

Flying roller coasters
Roller coasters introduced in 2004
Roller coasters in Ontario
Roller coasters operated by Cedar Fair
Works based on Tomb Raider